Bury is an English and French surname. Notable people with the surname include:
 Aliaksandr Bury (born 1987), Belorussian tennis player
 Bernard de Bury (1720–1785), French musician
 Richard de Bury (1287–1345), English priest, teacher, bishop, writer and bibliophile
 Robert of Bury (died 1181), English boy murder victim and Roman Catholic saint
 Ambrose Bury (1869–1961), Canadian politician
 Charles Bury, 1st Earl of Charleville (1764–1835), Irish politician
 Charles Bury, 2nd Earl of Charleville (1801–1851), Irish politician, son of the above
 Lady Charlotte Bury (1775–1861), English novelist
 Chris Bury (born 1953), American journalist
 Edward Bury (1794–1858), British locomotive manufacturer
 Edward Bury (minister) (1616–1700), English ejected minister
 Edward Bury (MP) for Maldon (UK Parliament constituency) in 1542
 Frank Bury (1910–1944), British composer
 Frederick Bury (1836–1885), English cricketer
 George Wyman Bury (1874–1920), British army officer, explorer and naturalist 
 Jan Bury (born 1963), Polish politician
 Jan Stanisław Bury (born 1977), Polish political scientist
 John Bury (disambiguation) 
 Józef Bury (born 1961), Polish artist
 Judson Sykes Bury (1852–1944), British physician
 Kamil Bury (born 1995), Polish cross-country skier
 Les Bury (1913–1986), Australian politician
 Oliver Robert Hawke Bury (1861–1946), English railway engineer, chief mechanical engineer on the Great Western Railway of Brazil, General Manager of the Great Northern Railway in England and Director of the London and North Eastern Railway
 Pol Bury (1922–2005), Belgian sculptor
 Priscilla Susan Bury (1799–1872), British botanist  and illustrator
 Thomas Bury (judge)  (1655–1722), English judge and Chief Baron of the Exchequer
 Thomas Talbot Bury (1809–1877), British architect and lithographer
 William Bury (disambiguation)

English-language surnames
French-language surnames